The 2015 BMW PGA Championship was the 61st edition of the BMW PGA Championship, an annual golf tournament on the European Tour, held 21–24 May at the West Course of Wentworth Club in Virginia Water, Surrey, England, a suburb southwest of London.

Course layout

Field

Past champions in the field

Made the cut

Missed the cut

Nationalities in the field

Round summaries

First round
Thursday, 21 May 2015

Francesco Molinari took a two stroke lead after a bogey-free round of 65. Molinari finished joint second in the Open de España the previous week and finished in the top 10 in the BMW PGA Championship in 2012, 2013 and 2014.

Second round
Friday, 22 May 2015

Third round
Saturday, 23 May 2015

Final round
Sunday, 24 May 2015

References

External links
Coverage on European Tour official site
Wentworth Club: Golf

BMW PGA Championship
Golf tournaments in England
BMW PGA Championship
BMW PGA Championship
BMW PGA Championship